Leroy Colquhoun (born 1 March 1980) is a Jamaican sprinter. He won a silver medal in 4 x 400 metres relay at the 2003 IAAF World Indoor Championships and a gold medal in the same event at the 2004 IAAF World Indoor Championships.

Colquhoun ran track collegiately at Louisiana State University.

Before starting his sprinting career he attended trials for the Jamaica national bobsled team.

Personal bests
 400 metres – 45.50 (2001)
 400 metres hurdles – 48.79 (2005)

External links
 

Jamaican male sprinters
LSU Tigers track and field athletes
1980 births
Living people
World Athletics Indoor Championships winners